Tadanari (written: 忠成) is a masculine Japanese given name. Notable people with the name include:

 (1551–1613), Japanese daimyō
 (born 1985), Japanese footballer
 (1653–1713), Japanese daimyō
 (1932–1990), Japanese animator

Japanese masculine given names